The Madness of Love is a 1922 American silent drama film written and directed by Wray Physioc.  The film stars Jean Scott, Charles Craig, and Bernard Siegel.

Cast list

References

American black-and-white films
American silent feature films
1922 drama films
1922 films
Films directed by Wray Physioc
1920s English-language films
1920s American films
Silent American drama films